Jaal is a 1952 Hindi crime noir film directed by Guru Dutt. The film stars Dev Anand, Geeta Bali in lead roles. The film was successful at box office and was the third-highest-grossing film of the year in India. Its music became popular, especially the song "Yeh Raat Yeh Chandni Phir Kahan".

Jaal is considered a noir classic for its grey shade characters which were among the first of its type in Indian cinema. Filmfare listed it in Best Bollywood Noir Films of '50s. Jaal was one of the first film made in India that portrayed an Anti-Hero character in the lead. It established the idea of Anti-Hero with "no qualms about bending moral codes" in Hindi cinema.

Plot 
After losing his vision during a storm, Carlos (K.N. Singh) lives with his sister, Maria (Geeta Bali), on the Indian coast in a fishing village. One day a mysterious young woman, Lisa, enters their lives, followed by a mysterious man, Tony Fernandes (Dev Anand). Maria and Tony fall in love with each other, much to the chagrin of Simon, who loves Maria and wants to marry her. Lisa then warns Maria that she has known Tony, they have had an affair together, and he had betrayed her, however, this warning has no effect on Maria. Then a gypsy palm-reader also cautions Maria that she may be headed for disaster at the hands of a stranger. The question remains: who exactly are Lisa and Tony, and what is the reason behind their presence in this fishing community; and whether or not Maria is being drawn into a web of lies and deceit at the hands of Tony?

Set in a fishing village of Goa, this film depicts the ties between Tony, a good-for-nothing man from the city, and Maria, a village girl who loves him innocently. The spirit of Christian love and forgiveness lies at the base of the story, and the film has a strong religious colour to it.

Cast 
Geeta Bali as Maria
Dev Anand as Tony Fernandes
Purnima as Lisa
K. N. Singh as Carlos
Ram Sing as Simon
Rasheed as
Krishna Kumari as
Johnny Walker
Raj Khosla

Songs 
All the songs were composed by S. D. Burman and the lyrics were penned by Sahir Ludhianvi.

Shooting Location 
One of the shooting locations for the movie was Malvan, Sindhudurg District, returning from where Dev Anand and Geeta Bali met with an accident. He almost broke his ribs. They spent some time in the local hospital for recovery.

References

External links 
 

1952 films
1950s Hindi-language films
Films scored by S. D. Burman
Films directed by Guru Dutt
Indian crime thriller films
1950s crime thriller films
Indian black-and-white films